Quarry-faced stone is stone with a rough, unpolished surface, straight from the quarry.

References

Building stone
Building materials
Natural materials
Stone (material)